Leukocyte immunoglobulin-like receptor subfamily B member 2 is a protein that in humans is encoded by the LILRB2 gene.

This gene is a member of the leukocyte immunoglobulin-like receptor (LIR) family, which is found in a gene cluster at chromosomal region 19q13.4. The encoded protein belongs to the subfamily B class of LIR receptors which contain two or four extracellular immunoglobulin domains, a transmembrane domain, and two to four cytoplasmic immunoreceptor tyrosine-based inhibitory motifs (ITIMs). The receptor is expressed on immune cells where it binds to MHC class I molecules on antigen-presenting cells and transduces a negative signal that inhibits stimulation of an immune response. It is thought to control inflammatory responses and cytotoxicity to help focus the immune response and limit autoreactivity. Multiple transcript variants encoding different isoforms have been found for this gene.

LILBR2 plays a critical role in the inhibition of axonal regeneration and functional recovery after brain injury. However, recent studies demonstrate that LILRB2 is a β-Amyloid receptor and may contribute to synaptic loss and cognitive impairment in Alzheimer's disease.

Interactions 

LILRB2 has been shown to interact with PTPN6.

See also 
 Cluster of differentiation

References

Further reading

External links 
 
 
 

Clusters of differentiation
Immunoglobulin superfamily